The San Lucan alligator lizard (Elgaria paucicarinata) is a species of medium-sized lizard in the family Anguidae. The species is endemic to Mexico.

References

Elgaria
Reptiles of Mexico
Reptiles described in 1934